This is a list of awards and nominations received by American singer Cyndi Lauper. Among her numerous accolades, Lauper has won two Grammys (1985, 2014) an Emmy (1995) and a Tony (2013), which are three of the four major annual American entertainment awards (EGOT).

Billboard Music Awards 
The Billboard Music Awards are held to honour artists for commercial performance in the U.S., based on record charts published by Billboard.

|-
| rowspan=9|1984
| rowspan=8|Cyndi Lauper
| Top Female Artist
| 
|-
| Top New Artist
| 
|-
| Top Billboard 200 Artist – Female
| 
|-
| Top Hot 100 Artist – Female
| 
|-
| Top Hot 100 Artist
| 
|-
| Top Disco Artist
| 
|-
| Top Disco Artist – Female
| 
|-
| Top Adult Contemporary Artist – Female
| 
|-
| "Time After Time"
| Top Adult Contemporary Single
| 
|-
| rowspan=8|1985
| rowspan=5|Cyndi Lauper
| Top Artist
| 
|-
| Top Billboard 200 Artist
| 
|-
| Top Billboard 200 Artist – Female
| 
|-
| Top Hot 100 Artist
| 
|-
| Top Hot 100 Artist – Female
| 
|-
| She's So Unusual
| Top Billboard 200 Album
| 
|-
| rowspan=2|"All Through the Night"
| Top Hot 100 Song
| 
|-
| Top Adult Contemporary Single
| 
|-
| rowspan=8|1986
| rowspan=5|Cyndi Lauper
| Top Artist
| 
|-
| Top Billboard 200 Artist
| 
|-
| Top Billboard 200 Artist – Female
| 
|-
| Top Hot 100 Artist
| 
|-
| Top Hot 100 Artist – Female
| 
|-
| True Colors
| Top Billboard 200 Album
| 
|-
| rowspan=2|"Change of Heart"
| Top Hot 100 Song
| 
|-
| Top Dance Club Play Single
|

Grammy Awards 
The Grammy Awards are awarded annually by the National Academy of Recording Arts and Sciences. Lauper won two awards from 16 nominations.

|-
|rowspan="5"|1985
|Cyndi Lauper
|Best New Artist
|
|-
|She's So Unusual
|Album of the Year
|
|-
|"Time After Time"
|Song of the Year
|
|-
|rowspan="2"|"Girls Just Want To Have Fun"
|Record of the Year
|
|-
|Best Female Pop Vocal Performance
|
|-
|1986
|"What A Thrill"
|Best Female Rock Vocal Performance
|
|-
|rowspan="2"|1987
|"True Colors"
|Best Female Pop Vocal Performance
|
|-
|"911"
|Best Female Rock Vocal Performance
|
|-
|1988
|"Cyndi Lauper in Paris"
|Best Performance Music Video
|
|-
|1990
|"I Drove All Night"
|Best Female Rock Vocal Performance
|
|-
|1999
|"Disco Inferno"
|Best Dance Recording
|
|-
|2005
|"Unchained Melody"
|Best Instrumental Arrangement Accompanying Vocalist(s)
|
|-
|2009
|Bring Ya To The Brink
|Best Electronic/Dance Album
|
|-
|2011
|Memphis Blues
|Best Traditional Blues Album
|
|-
|2014
|Kinky Boots
|Best Musical Theater Album
|
|-
|2017
|Kinky Boots
|Best Musical Theater Album
|
|}

MTV Video Music Award 
The MTV Video Music Awards were established in 1984 by MTV to celebrate the top music videos of the year. Lauper won three awards from 16 nominations, being the first win in the category Best Female Video.

|-
|rowspan="9"|1984
|rowspan="6"|"Girls Just Want to Have Fun"
|Video of the Year
|
|-
|Best New Artist
|
|-
|Best Female Video
|
|-
|Best Concept Video
|
|-
|Viewer's Choice
|
|-
|Best Overall Performance
|
|-
|rowspan="3"|"Time After Time"
|Best New Artist
|
|-
|Best Female Video
|
|-
|Best Direction
|
|-
|rowspan="5"|1985
|rowspan="4"|"We Are the World"
|Video of the Year
|
|-
|Best Group Video
|
|-
|Viewer's Choice
|
|-
|Best Overall Performance
|
|-
|"She Bop"
|Best Female Video
|
|-
|rowspan="2"|1987
|"True Colors"
|Best Female Video
|
|-
|"What's Going On"
|Best Cinematography
|

Smash Hits Poll Winners Party 
The Smash Hits Poll Winners Party was an awards ceremony held annually by British magazine Smash Hits, and broadcast on BBC One.

|-
| rowspan=2|1984
| rowspan=9|Herself
| Most Fanciable Female
| 
|-
| rowspan=2|Best Female Singer
| 
|-
| rowspan=2|1985
| 
|-
| Worst Female Singer
| 
|-
| rowspan=2|1986
| Worst Dressed Person
|
|-
| Best Female Singer
| 
|-
| 1987
| rowspan=2|Worst Female Singer
| 
|-
| rowspan=2|1994
| 
|-
| Best Female Solo Singer
|

Other awards 

{| class=wikitable
|-
! Year !! Awards !! Work !! Category !! Result
|-
| rowspan="2"|1983
| American Video Awards
| "Girls Just Want to Have Fun"
| Best Female Performance
| 
|-
| rowspan="2"|Performance Magazine Awards
| rowspan="2"|Herself
| Most Promising Female Vocalist
| 
|-
| rowspan="7"|1984
| Pop Breakout of the Year
| 
|-
| rowspan="2"|NARM Awards
| rowspan="2"|She's So Unusual
| Best Selling Album by a New Artist
| 
|-
| Best Selling Album by a Female Artist
| 
|-
| Juno Awards
| "Girls Just Want to Have Fun"
| Best Selling Single
| 
|-
| Ms. Magazine
| rowspan="1"|Herself
| Woman of the Year
| 
|-
| rowspan="2"|American Video Awards
| rowspan="3"|"Time After Time"
| rowspan="1"|Best Female Performance
| 
|-
| Best Pop Video
| 
|-
| rowspan="7"|1985
| Pro Canada Awards
| Most Performed Foreign Song
| 
|-
| Pollstar Concert Industry Awards
| rowspan="6"|Herself
| Favorite New Headliner of the Year
| 
|-
| rowspan="2"|Rolling Stone Awards
| Best New Artist
| 
|-
| Best Female Video Artist
| 
|-
| Women in Film Crystal + Lucy Awards
| New Directions Award
| 
|-
| rowspan="3"|American Music Awards
| Favorite Pop/Rock Female Artist
| 
|-
| Favorite Pop/Rock Female Video Artist
| 
|-
| rowspan="4"|1986
| rowspan="2"|"We Are The World"
| Song of the Year
| 
|-
| People's Choice Awards
| Favorite New Song
| 
|-
| Slammy Awards
| Herself
| Best Producer
| 
|-
| ASCAP Pop Music Awards
| "Time After Time"
| Most Performed Song
| 
|-
| 1987
| Japan Gold Disc Awards
| True Colors
| Best Album of the Year – Rock/Folk
| 
|-
| rowspan="3"|1988
| New York Music Awards
| Herself
| Best Female Rock Vocalist
| 
|-
| Photography Awards
| rowspan="2"|"What's Going On"
| Best Art Direction
| 
|-
| Art Directors' Club 67th Annual Exhibition
| Merit Award
| 
|-
| 1989
| FM Tokyo Pop Best 10
| "I Drove All Night"
| Song of the Year
| 
|-
| 1993
| Ms. Magazine
| Herself
| Woman of the Year
| 
|-
| 1994
| rowspan="2"|Emmy Awards
| rowspan="2"|Mad About You
| rowspan="2"|Outstanding Guest Actress in a Comedy Series
| 
|-
| 1995
| 
|-
| rowspan=2|1996
| IFPI Platinum Europe Awards
| Twelve Deadly Cyns...and Then Some
| Award Level 1
| 
|-
| rowspan="2"|Apex Awards
| "Unhook the Stars"
| rowspan="2"|Original Song Comedy
| 
|-
| rowspan="3"|2000
| rowspan="3"|"I Want a Mom That Will Last Forever"
| 
|-
| rowspan="2"|Fennecus Awards
| Original Song
| 
|-
| Song Performance
| 
|-
| rowspan=2|2005
| Telecom Mobile Music Awards
| "Girls Just Want to Have Fun"
| Gold Award
| 
|-
| PFLAG Awards
| rowspan="9"|Herself
| Celebrity Leadership Award
| 
|-
| 2007
| HRC Awards
| National Equality Award
| 
|-
| rowspan="2"|2009
| Black Tie Awards
| Media Award
| 
|-
| Out 100 Awards
| Ally of the Year
| 
|-
| rowspan="2"|2010
| GLSEN The Respect Awards
| Inspiration Award
| 
|-
| NARM Awards
| Chairman's Award
| 
|-
| rowspan="4"|2011
| OUTMUSIC Awards
| Person of the Year
| 
|-
| Ride of Fame
| Inductee
| 
|-
| rowspan=2|New York Music Awards
| Best Female Blues Artist
| 
|-
| Memphis Blues
| Best Blues Album
| 
|-
| rowspan="2"|2013
| Tony Awards
| rowspan="2"|Kinky Boots
| Best Original Score
| 
|-
| Outer Critics Circle Awards
| Outstanding New Score
| 
|-
| rowspan="2"|2015
| Songwriters Hall of Fame
| Herself
| Inductee
| 
|-
| Annie Awards
| Henry & Me
| Outstanding Achievement in Voice Acting in an Animated Feature Production
| 
|-
| rowspan="2"|2016
| Laurence Olivier Awards
| Kinky Boots
| Outstanding Achievement in Music
| 
|-
| Hollywood Walk of Fame
| rowspan="2"|Herself
| Recording
| 
|-
| rowspan=2|2017
| VH1 Trailblazer Honor
| Honoree
| 
|-
| British LGBT Awards
| Kinky Boots
| Media Moment
| 
|-
| 2020
|Queerty Awards
| Herself
| Straight Best Friend
|

BMI Awards 
The Broadcast Music, Incorporated (BMI) Awards is an annual award show hosted for the purpose of giving awards to songwriters. Songwriters are selected each year from the entire BMI catalog, based on the number of performances during the award period.
1984 – Pop Award for "Time After Time" (Won)
1985 – Pop Award for "She Bop" (Won)
1988 – Pop Award for "Change Of Heart" (Won)
2008 – BMI Millionaire Award for 5 Million Spins on US radio for "Time After Time" (Won)
2009 – Pop Award for "Time After Time" (Won)

Other recognitions

References 

Lauper, Cyndi
Lauper, Cyndi
Awards